The 2012 Bangladesh Premier League, also known as Destiny-boishakhi BPL 2012 (for sponsorship reasons), was the first season of the Bangladesh Premier League (BPL) established by the Bangladesh Cricket Board (BCB). The competition featured six franchises and used a tournament format with a double round robin group stage followed by two semi-finals and a final. The season began on 9 February with the final played on 29 February. The competition was won by Dhaka Gladiators.

Matches were held in Dhaka and Chittagong. The six franchises represented Dhaka, Barisal, Chittagong, Khulna, Rajshahi and Sylhet divisions. The franchise auction was held on 10 January and the player auction took place on 18 and 19 January.

Opening ceremony 
The President of Bangladesh Zillur Rahman launched the tournament during an opening ceremony held at the Sher-e-Bangla Cricket Stadium in Dhaka on 9 February 2012. The ceremony featured dancers, actors and singers and ended with fireworks and a laser lighting display.

Venues 
A total of 33 matches, including the semi-finals and final, were held at two venues in Chittagong and Dhaka. The Zohur Ahmed Chowdhury Stadium in Chittagong hosted eight matches, with the majority of matches, including all playoff matches and the final, being held at the Sher-e-Bangla National Cricket Stadium in Dhaka.

Sponsors
Bangladeshi group Destiny and the Boishakhi TV channel were the title sponsors the tournament, paying Tk. 7.50 crore. Other sponsors included the Bangladesh Tourism Board, United Airways and Islami Bank Bangladesh Ltd. Channel 9 was the main broadcaster for the tournament. The management partner was Game On, an Indian sports company, which organised the logistics of the tournament.

Controversies

Match fixing
BPL 2012 had its first brush with controversy even before the tournament started. Mashrafe Mortaza, one of Bangladesh's leading fast bowlers and captain of the Dhaka Gladiators, reported a potential spot-fixing approach by a fellow cricketer and that BPL matches could be hit by fixing to the team management. As of developments so far, the franchise had informed the BPL of the approach, according to Gladiators media manager Minhaz Uddin Khan. Furthermore, an ICC ACSU officer was already in Dhaka to conduct the situation.

Overdue payments
The league was supposed to pay players in installments during the tournament, with 25% of their wages due before the start of the tournament, 50% during the tournament and the remainder at the end. A series of financial irregularities meant that many overseas players had only received the first 25% well after the tournament ended. Most eventually received their payments, although players from Pakistan were still awaiting theirs in April 2012.

Semi final confusion
The first semi-final of the BPL will have the team that finished first in the league playing the team that finished fourth. Duronto Rajshahi finished first, with 14 points, but until 2.00 am on the morning of the semi-final, it wasn't clear who finished fourth.  Initially, it was announced that Barisal Burners were through to the semis, after their victory against Chittagong Kings, on the basis of net run-rate. At that point, the other two spots were going to be contested between Chittagong, Khulna Royal Bengals and Dhaka Gladiators. The next day, after Dhaka lost narrowly to Rajshahi and Khulna beat Sylhet Royals, Khulna went to second place with 12 points, leaving Dhaka, Barisal and Chittagong tied on 10 points at the end of the league phase.  In the head-to-head results between the teams level on 10 points, Dhaka had beaten Barisal twice and Chittagong once and had a superior net-run rate and qualified for the semi-finals in third place. That now left Chittagong and Barisal in contention for the fourth spot. It was initially announced that Chittagong were in the semi-finals, presumably on the basis of a better head-to-head record in the three-way tie on 10 points, which included Dhaka. At 2.45 am of the game, however, the BPL issued a release which said that Barisal was the fourth semi-finalist, presumably because their head-to-head record with Chittagong. The decision was taken according to the rules and regulations of BPL which was announced before the tournament launch. According to the rules and regulations, if more than two teams tie at same points during group stage, the first preference is the number of wins of the teams during group stage. Dhaka, Chittagong and Barishal had 5 wins each. The second preference was the net run-rate of the teams and according to that Dhaka was placed third, Barishal was placed fourth and Chittagong were eliminated by being placed fifth.

Player auction

Players were assigned to franchises at a player auction, held in Dhaka on 19 January 2012. Each franchise was allowed to sign 18 players, including up to eight non-Bangladeshi players. A maximum of five overseas players could have been played in each matches.

Format 
Each franchise played ten matches in the group stage of the competition, playing twice against every other team. The top four teams qualified for the semi-final stage.

The tournament rules stated that if a match ended with the scores tied that a super over would be used to decide the match. If more than one team ended the group stage of the competition on the same number of points the regulations said that the teams would be ranked using the criteria:

 Higher number of wins
 If still equal, net run rate
 If still equal, lower bowling strike rate

Group stage 
During the group stage of the tournament Duronto Rajshahi won seven of their ten matches and finished top of the league table with Khulna Royal Bengals, who won six matches, finishing second. Three teams, Barisal Burners, Chittagong Kings and Dhaka Gladiators, all finished with five wins and ten points. The tournament regulations stated that if teams finished level on points and had each won the same number of matches, that net run rate would be used to decide the rankings for teams. After some confusion, Dhaka Gladiators were placed third in the group stage followed by Barisal Burners, with Chittagoing Kings eliminated from the competition.

Note: The top four teams advance to the semi-finals.

Group stage fixtures

Knockout stage 
The organisers of the tournament caused some controversy after the broadcasters awarded the final semifinal spot on air to the Barisal Burners based on their superior net run rate over the Chittagong Kings, both of which were tied on the same number of points with only one of the two to progress to the next round. The following day (27 February 2011) officials from the Bangladesh Premier League confirmed that Chittagong Kings would progress to the next round, in place of the Burners, due to a better head-to-head record. Later that day the officials retracted their initial decision and replaced the Kings with the Burners as the 4th placed team based on their superior net run rate.

Semi-finals

Final

See also
 2012 Bangladesh Premier League squads

References

External links 
 Bangladesh Premier League Website
 BPLT20 2012 Fixtures
 Bangladesh Premier League CricInfo minisite

 
Bangladesh Premier League
2012 in cricket
Bangladesh Premier League seasons
2012 in Bangladeshi cricket